The All Japan Chemistry Workers' Union (JCWU, Zenkoku Kagaku) was a trade union representing workers in the chemical industry in Japan.

The union was founded on 20 October 1987, by 30 local unions which were expelled from the Japanese Federation of Synthetic Chemistry Workers' Unions (Goka Roren), due to an internal dispute.  The union affiliated to the Japanese Trade Union Confederation, initially with 25,000 members, although by 1996, this had declined to only 10,540.  In October 1998, the union merged with Goka Roren, to form the Japanese Federation of Chemistry Workers' Unions.

References

Chemical industry trade unions
Trade unions established in 1987
Trade unions disestablished in 1998
Trade unions in Japan